Lassipa is a genus of Asian butterflies distributed from India to Sulawesi. They resemble Neptis but are smaller and marked yellow not white.

Species

Lasippa bella (Staudinger, 1889)
Lasippa ebusa (C. & R. Felder, 1863)
Lasippa heliodore (Fabricius, 1787)
Lasippa illigera (Eschscholtz, 1821)
Lasippa illigerella (Staudinger, 1889)
Lasippa monata (Weyenbergh, 1874)
Lasippa neriphus (Hewitson, 1868)
Lasippa nirvana Felder 1867
Lasippa pata (Moore, 1858)
Lasippa tiga (Moore, 1858)
Lasippa viraja (Moore, 1872)

References

External links
Images representing Lasippa at EOL
Images representing Lasippa at BOLD

Limenitidinae
Nymphalidae genera
Taxa named by Frederic Moore